Philippe Pollet-Villard (born October 30, 1960) is a French filmmaker. He won the Academy Award for Best Live Action Short Film in 2007 for his film Le Mozart des pickpockets. For the film, he also won the César Award for Best Short Film. He is a native of Annecy, France.

Filmography
 2013 : Joséphine

References

External links

French film directors
Directors of Live Action Short Film Academy Award winners
Living people
1960 births